Neonauclea is a genus of flowering plants in the family Rubiaceae. It comprises about 71 species.
Neonauclea is a genus of shrubs and trees They are indigenous to China, India, Southeast Asia, Wallacea, New Guinea and Australia.

Neonauclea was named in 1915 by Elmer Drew Merrill. The generic name is derived from the related genus Nauclea and the Greek word neos, meaning "new".

The biological type for Neonauclea consists of those specimens that Merrill called Neonauclea obtusa. These are now included in Neonauclea excelsa.

The circumscription of Neonauclea is uncertain. Molecular phylogenetic studies indicate that some related genera are probably embedded in it.

Species 

Neonauclea acuminata 
Neonauclea angustifolia 
Neonauclea anthraciticus 
Neonauclea artocarpoides 
Neonauclea bartlingii 
Neonauclea bomberaiensis 
Neonauclea borneensis 
Neonauclea brassii 
Neonauclea butonensis 
Neonauclea calcarea 
Neonauclea calycina 
Neonauclea celebica 
Neonauclea ceramensis 
Neonauclea chalmersii 
Neonauclea circumscissa 
Neonauclea clemensiae 
Neonauclea colla 
Neonauclea connicalycina 
Neonauclea coronata 
Neonauclea cyclophylla 
Neonauclea cyrtopoda 
Neonauclea endertii 
Neonauclea excelsa 
Neonauclea excelsioides 
Neonauclea formicaria 
Neonauclea forsteri 
Neonauclea gageana 
Neonauclea gigantea 
Neonauclea glabra 
Neonauclea glandulifera 
Neonauclea griffithii 
Neonauclea hagenii 
Neonauclea havilandii 
Neonauclea intercontinentalis 
Neonauclea jagorii 
Neonauclea kentii 
Neonauclea kraboensis 
Neonauclea kranjiensis 
Neonauclea lanceolata 
Neonauclea longipedunculata 
Neonauclea maluensis 
Neonauclea media 
Neonauclea montana 
Neonauclea morotaiensis 
Neonauclea obversifolia 
Neonauclea pallida 
Neonauclea paracyrtopoda 
Neonauclea parviflora 
Neonauclea perspicuinervia 
Neonauclea pseudoborneensis 
Neonauclea pseudocalycina 
Neonauclea pseudopeduncularis 
Neonauclea puberula 
Neonauclea purpurea 
Neonauclea reticulata 
Neonauclea rupestris 
Neonauclea sericea 
Neonauclea sessilifolia 
Neonauclea solomonensis 
Neonauclea subsessilis 
Neonauclea subulifera 
Neonauclea superba 
Neonauclea tricephala 
Neonauclea truncata 
Neonauclea tsaiana 
Neonauclea unicapitulifera 
Neonauclea ventricosa 
Neonauclea versteeghii 
Neonauclea vinkiorum 
Neonauclea viridiflora 
Neonauclea wenzelii

References

External links 
 Neonauclea At: Search Page At: World Checklist of Rubiaceae At: Index by Team At: Projects At: Science Directory At: Scientific Research and Data At: Kew Gardens
 Neonauclea At: Plant Names At: IPNI
 Neonauclea In: volume 5 Of: Journal of the Washington Academy of Sciences At: Titles At: Biodiversity Heritage Library
 Neonauclea At:Index Nominum Genericorum At: References At: NMNH Department of Botany At: Research and Collections At: Smithsonian National Museum of Natural History
 Neonauclea At: List of Genera At: Rubiaceae At: List of families At: Families and Genera in GRIN At: Queries At: GRIN taxonomy for plants

Rubiaceae genera
 
Taxa named by Elmer Drew Merrill